Since the previous elections, various polling companies have published surveys tracking voting intention for the 2018 Brazilian general election. The results of these surveys are listed below in reverse chronological order and include parties whose candidates frequently poll above 3% of the vote as well as the incumbent President of Brazil Michel Temer.

Presidential election

First round

Graphical summary

2018

July–Oct

Apr–Aug

Jan–Mar

2017

2016

2015

 1.Blank or null votes counted apart

Second round

Polling

Graphical summary

After the first round

Before the first round

See also

Graphical summaries

References

Opinion polling in Brazil
2018 Brazilian general election
Brazil